Graig-y-Rhacca is a housing estate bordering Trethomas, Bedwas and Machen in the borough of Caerphilly, southeastern Wales. The town is about 8 miles to the west of Newport and 4 miles to the east of Caerphilly. The town mainly consists of local authority tenancies and privately owned estates.

Population 
The median age of the town was 40 as of the 2011 census. The biggest age group in the town was 49-59 year olds, with 20% of the population. 96.7% of the population were from the United Kingdom with only 1.2% from outside of the EU, compared to 3.3% in Wales.

Populated places in Caerphilly County Borough